The 2000 New Hampshire Democratic presidential primary, was the second major test of the leading contenders for the Democratic Party's nomination as its candidate for the 2000 presidential election, took place on February 1, 2000.

Candidates
 Bill Bradley, former Senator from New Jersey
 Al Gore, incumbent Vice President of the United States from Tennessee

Campaign
Vice President Al Gore was seen as the frontrunner for the nomination, but after Bill Bradley received 36% in Iowa and was catching up to Gore in the polls the Gore campaign and many pundits believed that Bradley could defeat Gore and would use the momentum to propel himself into the nomination on Super Tuesday.

2000 results

Al Gore won 8 of New Hampshire's 10 counties. Bill Bradley lost the rest of the primaries by large margins and Al Gore would eventually lose the general election to Governor of Texas George W. Bush.

See also
 New Hampshire primaries
 2000 Democratic Party presidential primaries

References

Notes

2000
New Hampshire
Democratic primary